The Lang Bian white-bellied rat (Niviventer langbianis) is a species of rodent in the family Muridae.
It is found in India, Laos, Myanmar, Thailand, and Vietnam.

References

Rats of Asia
Niviventer
Mammals of East Asia
Rodents of India
Rodents of Southeast Asia
Rodents of Myanmar
Rodents of Laos
Rodents of Vietnam
Rodents of Cambodia
Rodents of Thailand
Mammals described in 1922
Taxonomy articles created by Polbot